Wardina Safiyyah Fadlullah Wilmot (born 5 June 1979) is a Malaysian actress, model, and TV host. She is of Australian and Acehnese descent.

Personal life 
Wardina is the second child of six siblings. Her Australian father, Fadlullah Wilmot, was invited by Tun Abdul Razak the former Prime Minister of Malaysia to work in Malaysia. Mr Wilmot met her mother Asmah Abdul Ghani an Acehnese when he volunteered to teach English in Aceh, Indonesia. Her father is an active humanitarian currently  working with Muslim Aid.

Married to Ikhwan Johari in September 2002.  She has 3 children; Amna Nafeesa, Azra Sareera and Imran Arrazi.

Her work experience ranges from broadcasting, entertainment, journalism, advertising, writing, public speaking, conducting seminars and various social work particularly working with children, women and the underprivileged.

Wardina will be best remembered as among the first "celebrity" in Malaysia to embrace covering up (the hijab). From a sexy model, she shocked the country when she decided to cover up and adorn the hijab. She later starred in the first hijab wearing shampoo commercial in the world for SUNSILK  without showing a single strand of hair. The advertisement won awards and sales of the shampoo brand tripled. Instead of slowing down, Wardina become more popular than even before since adorning the hijab. Many were curious on why she wanted to change her look and lifestyle? She found herself gracing magazine covers and received overwhelming response as well as offers which she never expected to happen.

She has found herself caught in between some controversial issues due to her speaking up particularly on her FB posts. She created a stir when questioning a religious leader, the treatment of disabled children  and the alleged sexual abuse incident in a religious school owned by a famous preacher 

She is seen as an icon and inspiration to many young women. Wardina has been seen to be more silent since moving to Australia keeping her life more private, she has not been sharing posts or pictures nor opinions as often.

Education 
Wardina speaks fluent in English and Malay. She is psychology graduate from Griffith University, Australia. (B.A of Psychological Science). She also holds a diploma in Interior architecture. She is currently pursuing an honours thesis before furthering her studies to attain a Masters in Clinical Psychology.

She completed her primary and high school education in Petaling Jaya, Malaysia.

Accomplishments & experience 
 Wardina has more than15 years of experience in the TV/broadcasting industry including hosting live TV talk shows such as "Wanita Hari Ini" and "Malaysia Hari Ini" – a current issues show on Malaysia's leading TV channel.
 Nominated for Pelakon TV Wanita Popular (ABPBH) & Pelakon Filem Wanita Popular (ABPBH) 2002
 Author of "Mama Saya Lapar" (Mum I'm Hungry) focusing on healthy nutrition for children and how to encourage children to eat healthy food  and a pictorial children's story book "Siapa Alien"? (Who is the Alien?) a book on how differences should not lead to prejudice 
 Mama Saya Lapar is listed as best seller in MPH Bookstore
 She has previously shared her thoughts and ideas as a regular columnist in a parenting magazine “Mami & Baby” and in a teen magazine “Gen-Q”.
 She has also been invited by various TV programs and radio stations to speak, sharing my thoughts and opinions on various topics such as parenting, religion and current affairs. Examples are an interview by ABC during a visit to Australia  and an interview on BBC.
 As a popular and influential celebrity, commentator and activist, this led to a very important appointment by the Prime Minister of Malaysia. Wardina was appointed as a member of the National Unity Council, which is tasked to provide recommendations to the Government of Malaysia on how to improve inter-communal and inter-religious relations.
 In 2013, she was also appointed as a Fellow with a government body—the Islamic Da’wah Foundation of Malaysia.
 Wardina was selected by the 'Australian Malaysian Institute' to participate in the inaugural Australia-Malaysia Cultural Exchange program to Australia in 2013 as one of six outstanding young Muslim community leaders.
 Wardina has been the face for countless brands as an ambassador and spokesperson.
 She was the previous President of a Non-Governmental Organization called Muslimah Interest Zone & Networking (MIZAN) which focuses on empowering Muslim women in Malaysia and carrying out charitable activities.

Public speaking 
She has worked and partnered with several universities in Malaysia including the University of Malaya, University Teknologi Malaysia, University Teknologi Petronas, International University Malaysia, Mara Technology University, Tun Hussein Onn University of Malaysia, University Kebangsaan Malaysia, University Tenaga National, Kuala Lumpur infrastructure University, Taylors College Malaysia, University Tenaga Nasional, Cyberjaya University College of Medical Sciences and various other public and private high schools and primary institutions.
Wardina speaks to students on issues of communication, self-image and self-confidence, love, religion, psychology, media as well as motivation.
She was invited to speak by the Malaysian Students Association in Southampton United Kingdom and students in Dongyang University South Korea in 2013.
Wardina was a regular speaker, moderator and emcee for both government and non-governmental institutions.
Among selected engagements include becoming the ambassador for the National Library of Malaysia and one of the reading icons for Scholastic Malaysia. She has also participated in reading campaign and events such as The Selangor Book Carnival and Malaysia Book Fair.
She has also accepted invitations by The Ministry of Women and Family Affairs, NAM Institute for the Empowerment of Women (NIEW), Istana Budaya under the Ministry of Information, Communication and Culture Malaysia, The Ministry of International Trade and Industry, Inland Revenue Board of Malaysia, Ministry of Urban Wellbeing, Housing and Local Government and the Prime Ministers Department.
Wardina helped raise awareness for Postnatal Depression and was invited to speak in the 17th Malaysian Conference on Psychological Medicine on the topic of Media Skills for Mental Health Professionals.
She was invited as one of the keynote speakers at the Asia Pacific Conference of Early Childhood Education Graduates at the University of Malaya in 2003.
Various Malaysian student bodies both local and international has invited  Wardina to speak in Malaysia, Korea, Aceh, the US, Egypt, Australia and the UK.

TV appearances 
Wardina has been doing many TV appearances like hosting Maher Zain Show Case and anchoring Malaysia Hari Ini (2005–2011). Her previous TV hosting are Fitrah Kasih (2009), Ibu Mithali (2008), Menatang Si Manja – RTM (2008), Edu TV – web portal for The Minister of Education (2008), Carta Nasyid Pilihan – TV9 (2008), Sambutan Malidur Rasul peringkat Kebangsaan (TV1), Hits from RIM – VJ, Pencarian Bintang RTM, Seri Laman (TV1), JOm Tukar!, Hijrah Remaja (Astro), Kisah-Kisah Anbia’ (TV3), Ramadhan World Delights 1 & 2, High 5 – JAKIM (TV1)

Acting 
She has since retired from acting completely. Among previous dramas include: IMPIAN (Sunsilk) Musim 2 (2009), Cinta Madinah Musim 1 & 2 (2006), Kalam Cinta Rabiah – TV3 (2007), Impian Illyana Musim 1,2 & 3 (2006–2007), “Children of Adam” VCD, Wardina & Keluarga Pak Tam VCD, Spanar Jaya (a leading sitcom in Malaysia that lasted for 8 seasons), Kepulangan (Astro), Julia – a TV series based on the award-winning novel of the same name (Astro). Her telemovies are Sayangku Puteri – Telemovie (TV1), Maka Diciptakannya Perempuan – Telemovie (NTV 7), Jodoh 2 Beradik – Telemovie (TV3), Berakhirnya Sebuah Ramadhan – Telemovie (TV3)  Wardina has appeared in movies, Lagi-Lagi Senario and Cinta 200 Ella

References

External links 
 

Malaysian television personalities
1979 births
Malaysian Muslims
Malaysian people of Australian descent
People from Kuala Lumpur
Living people
Malaysian people of Acehnese descent
Malaysian people of Malay descent